212 (two hundred [and] twelve) is the natural number following 211 and preceding 213.

In mathematics 
 
 totient sum for the first 26 integers

In other fields 
 +212 is the code for international direct-dial phone calls to Morocco
 Area code 212, the first telephone area code used for Manhattan
 "212" (song), a 2011 song by Harlem rapper Azealia Banks
 212 Medea, a very large Main belt asteroid
 Bell 212 helicopter
 Type 212 submarine
 212, a fragrance by Carolina Herrera
 212 action, a mass protest led by Indonesian Islamist groups
 Unit 212, an Israeli commando unit also known as Maglan
 In Fahrenheit degrees, the boiling point of water at sea level

References

Integers

ca:Nombre 210#Nombres del 211 al 219